Euplectalecia is a genus of beetles in the family Buprestidae, containing the following species:

 Euplectalecia beltii (Saunders, 1874)
 Euplectalecia buckleyi (Waterhouse, 1905)
 Euplectalecia cayennensis Obenberger, 1958
 Euplectalecia chevrolati (Kerremans, 1893)
 Euplectalecia cupriceps (Saunders, 1874)
 Euplectalecia cyaneonotata (Saunders, 1874)
 Euplectalecia elongata (Waterhouse, 1905)
 Euplectalecia erythropa (Gory, 1840)
 Euplectalecia fulvipes (Kerremans, 1903)
 Euplectalecia guttata (Waterhouse, 1882)
 Euplectalecia knabi Fisher, 1949
 Euplectalecia lesnei (Kerremans, 1909)
 Euplectalecia nana (Kerremans, 1909)
 Euplectalecia pulverulenta (Waterhouse, 1889)
 Euplectalecia quadricolor (Chevrolat, 1867)
 Euplectalecia ribbei (Théry, 1930)
 Euplectalecia semenovi Obenberger, 1928
 Euplectalecia senatoria (Chevrolat, 1838)
 Euplectalecia sexcostata (Waterhouse, 1905)
 Euplectalecia sordidenotata (Obenberger, 1924)
 Euplectalecia spectraloides Bellamy & Westcott, 1993
 Euplectalecia suffusa (Waterhouse, 1889)
 Euplectalecia waterhousei Obenberger, 1958

References

Buprestidae genera